Savuto Vakadewavosa also known as Fiji's Vude Prince is a Fijian singer-songwriter. He is the co-founder of the record label Spotlight Records and he is well known for his songs "Isa My Viti", "Giving Life", "Curu Mai", "E Na Bogi", and Misunderstood, At Fiji Performing Rights Association Music Awards, the largest performing rights in the south Pacific, he has so far won Best Itaukei Song for "Curu Mai" in 2015 and Most Popular Music Video for "Misunderstood" in 2018, A collaboration with DJ Ritendra.

Personal life
Born in Fiji in 1987 as Rusiate Savuto Harold Vakadewavosa, known by his stage name Savuto. He is a son of a Methodist church pastor.

Savuto is related to the Fijian rugby player, Isikeli Vuruna as first cousins.

Music career
His debut single from the forthcoming album, Bulou Noqu I Tau was a popular hit in his home country.

Collaborations 
Savuto is very well known for his collaborations with fijian composer DJ Ritendra, there single titled "Misunderstood" was a hit in their home country Fiji and won the Most Popular Music Video award at 2018 Fiji Performing Rights Association Music Awards.

Discography

Studio albums 
 Ra Sa Cariba (2015)
 Na Veika E Dau Yaco (2015)

Singles 
 Bridge of Hope (2009)
 Bulou Noqu I Tau ft. Sera Fatafehi (2011)
 Isa My Viti ft. Kiti Niumataiwalu (2011)
 Curu Mai (2012)
 Sa I Vagadaci (2012)
 Na Siga Ni Sucu ft. Jasmine Duxbury & Roland Williams (2013)
 Giving Life (2014)
 Make A Change (2014)
 Talei Vei Au with Lesaa & Tua (2015)
 Ra Sa Cariba ft. Laisa Vulakoro (2015)
 E Na Bogi (2015)
 We are Counting On You (2015)
 Gauna Ni Sereki ft. Lesaa (2015)
 Misunderstand with DJ Ritendra (2016)

Remixes 
 Sa I Vagadaci (2014)
 Curu Mai with DJ Ritendra (2015)
 E Na Bogi (Official Remix) with DJ Ritendra (2015)
 Gauna Ni Sereki (Reggaeton Remix with DJ Ritendra & Lesaa (2016)
 Misunderstand (Official Remix) with DJ Ritendra (2016)

Music videos
 Ra Sa Cariba with Laisa Vulakoro (2015)
 E Na Bogi (2016)
 Misunderstand with DJ Ritendra (2017)

Awards and nominations

Fiji Performing Rights Association Music Awards

See also 

 Fiji Performing Rights Association
 Curu Mai

References

External links 
 facebook.com/officialsavuto
 twitter.com/savuto

Fijian music
Fijian musicians
Living people
People from Suva
1987 births
Male singer-songwriters
Fijian Methodists